Pile of Skulls is the seventh studio album by Running Wild, released in 1992. It is their last album with guitarist Axel Morgan.

The song "Jennings' Revenge" tells about the exploits of pirate Henry Jennings.

The lyrics of "Treasure Island" are based on the book of the same title by 19th century author Robert Louis Stevenson.

Critical reception 

Pile of Skulls was met with mostly positive reviews from critics. Steve Huey of All Music Guide called it one of Running Wild's strongest efforts. While calling it too ambitious, he thought Pile of Skulls combined the group's trademark pirate subject matter with a unifying concept about corruption and abuse of power throughout history.

In a 2013 interview, Rolf Kasparek spoke about the song "Bloody Island" from the 2013 album Resilient and explained that the demo version of the song would've been a great fit on the album.

Track listing 
Music and lyrics written by Rolf Kasparek, except "Pile of Skulls" by Kasparek and Axel Morgan and "Win or Be Drowned" by Kasparek and Piotr Smuszynski.

The 2017 Remastered version contains a second disc, featuring the following songs

Personnel 
 Rolf Kasparek – vocals, guitar
 Axel Morgan – guitar
 Thomas Smuszynski – bass
 Stefan Schwarzmann – drums

Additional Musician
 Ralf Nowy – keyboards on "Chamber of Lies", effects on "Sinister Eyes"

Production
 Jan Němec – engineer, mixing
 Thomas Körge – engineer
 Karl-U. Walterbach – executive producer
 Rock 'n' Rolf – producer
 Andreas Marschall – cover art

Charts

References 

1992 albums
Running Wild (band) albums